William T. Freeman is the Thomas and Gerd Perkins Professor of Electrical Engineering and Computer Science at the Massachusetts Institute of Technology. He is known for contributions to computer vision.

Education
Freeman received his undergraduate degree in physics from Stanford University in 1979, and his Ph.D. from MIT in 1992.

Career and research
Freeman worked at Mitsubishi Electric Research Labs before joining the faculty at MIT in 2001, where he is currently Thomas and Gerd Perkins Professor of Electrical Engineering and Computer Science. He served as the Associate Department Head from 2011 to 2014.

Freeman's research interests include machine learning applied to computer vision, Bayesian models of visual perception, and computational photography. He has also made research contributions on steerable filters and pyramids, orientation histograms, the generic viewpoint assumption, color constancy, computer vision for computer games, and belief propagation in networks with loops. He received outstanding paper awards at computer vision or machine learning conferences in 1997, 2006, 2009 and 2012, and test-of-time awards for papers from 1990 and 1995.

Awards and honors
Freeman is a fellow of the Association for Computing Machinery (ACM), the Institute of Electrical and Electronics Engineers (IEEE) and the Association for the Advancement of Artificial Intelligence (AAAI). In 2021, he was elected to the National Academy of Engineering for contributions in Computer Science and Engineering.

References 

MIT School of Engineering faculty
Massachusetts Institute of Technology alumni
Artificial intelligence researchers
1957 births
Living people
Stanford University alumni
Fellows of the Association for Computing Machinery
Fellow Members of the IEEE
Fellows of the Association for the Advancement of Artificial Intelligence